The 2022–23 Summit League women's basketball season began non-conference play on November 7, 2022. The conference schedule began on December 19, 2022. This will be the sixteenth season under the Summit League name and the 41st since the conference was established under its current charter as the Association of Mid-Continent Universities in 1982.

The Summit League tournament took place from March 3–7, 2023. South Dakota State won the tournament after beating Omaha in the tournament final, and advanced to the NCAA tournament. Since the Jacks were the regular season winner as well, North Dakota State was automatically invited to participate in the 2023 Women's National Invitation Tournament. North Dakota received an invitation to play in the Women's Basketball Invitational.

Pre-season

Preseason watchlists
Below is a table of notable preseason watch lists.

Preseason polls

Summit League Coaches' Poll

Source:

Summit League Preseason All-Conference

Preseason All-Summit League First Team

Preseason All-Summit League Second Team

Midseason watchlists
Below is a table of notable midseason watch lists.

Regular season
The schedule was released in early August.

Records against other conferences
2022–23 records against non-conference foes as of March 18, 2023:

Regular Season

Post Season

Record against ranked non-conference opponents
This is a list of games against ranked opponents only (rankings from the AP Poll):

Team rankings are reflective of AP poll when the game was played, not current or final ranking

† denotes game was played on neutral site

Conference schedule
This table summarizes the head-to-head results between teams in conference play.

As of February 25, 2023

Points scored

Through February 25, 2023

Rankings

Home attendance

Bold - Exceed capacity
As of February 25, 2023
Does not include exhibition games

Head coaches

Coaching changes

Kansas City
On March 20, 2022, Jacie Hoyt left Kansas City for the Oklahoma State head coaching job. On March 30, 2022, Texas associate head coach Dionnah Jackson-Durrett was hired a new head coach.

Oral Roberts
On March 30, 2022 Misti Cussen and Oral Roberts parted ways after 10 seasons. On April 21 Golden Eagles appointed new head coach Kelsi Musick, who led the Division II member Southwestern Oklahoma State team the past 13 seasons.

South Dakota
On March 31, 2022 Dawn Plitzuweit left South Dakota after 6 seasons for the West Virginia head coaching job. Drake assistant coach Kayla Karius, who was an assistant for the Coyotes from 2016 to 2018, was hired on April 10, 2022.

Coaches
Note: Stats shown are before the beginning of the season. Overall and Summit League records are from time at current school.

Notes:
  St. Thomas joined the Summit League in the Summer of 2021.
 Overall and Summit League records, conference titles, etc. are from time at current school and are through the end the 2021–22 season.
 NCAA tournament appearances are from time at current school only.

Awards and honors

Players of the Week 
Throughout the conference regular season, the Summit League offices named one or two players of the week each Monday.

Summit League Awards
The All-Summit League teams and the player of the year awards were announced on March 2, 2023 ahead of the start of the Summit League tournament.

Post season

Summit League tournament

NCAA tournament

Only South Dakota State was selected to participate in the tournament as the conference's automatic bid.

WNIT

As the next best regular season finishing team in the conference, North Dakota State was the only team selected to participate in the tournament.

WBI

Only one team was invited to play in the 2023 Women's Basketball Invitational, and that was North Dakota.

References

 
Summit League women's basketball season
Summit League women's basketball season
Summit League women's basketball season
Summit League women's basketball season
Summit League women's basketball season
Summit League women's basketball season
Summit League women's basketball season
Summit League women's basketball season
Summit League women's basketball season
Summit League women's basketball season
Summit League women's basketball season
Summit League women's basketball season
Summit League women's basketball season
Summit League women's basketball season
Summit League women's basketball season
Summit League women's basketball season